The Dr. Lewis Condict House is a historic house located at 51 South Street in Morristown of Morris County, New Jersey. Built in 1797, it was added to the National Register of Historic Places on April 3, 1973, for its significance in architecture and health/medicine. In 1937, the Woman's Club of Morristown purchased the house for its headquarters. The house was added as a contributing property to the Morristown District on October 30, 1973.

History and description
The house was built by Dr. Lewis Condict (1772–1862) in 1797. The land was previously owned by his uncle, Silas Condict (1738–1801), a member of the Continental Congress. The house is a 2  story frame building featuring Federal style.

Lewis Condict was president of the Medical Society of New Jersey, 1816–1819. He was the first president of the Morris and Essex Railroad.

See also
 National Register of Historic Places listings in Morris County, New Jersey

References

External links
 

Morristown, New Jersey
Houses on the National Register of Historic Places in New Jersey
Houses completed in 1797
Houses in Morris County, New Jersey
National Register of Historic Places in Morris County, New Jersey
Federal architecture in New Jersey
Individually listed contributing properties to historic districts on the National Register in New Jersey
New Jersey Register of Historic Places